A queen post is a tension member in a truss that can span longer openings than a king post truss. A king post uses one central supporting post, whereas the queen post truss uses two. Even though it is a tension member, rather than a compression member, they are commonly still called a post. A queen post is often confused with a queen strut, one of two compression members in roof framing which do not form a truss in the engineering sense.

The double punch truss appeared in Central Europe during the Renaissance.

Architecture

A queen-post bridge has two uprights, placed about one-third of the way from each end of the truss. They are connected across the top by a beam and use a diagonal brace between the outer edges. The central square between the two verticals is either unbraced (on shorter spans), or has one or two diagonal braces for rigidity. A single diagonal reaches between opposite corners; two diagonal braces may either reach from the bottom of each upright post to the center of the upper beam, or form a corner-to-corner "X" inside the square.

See also
 Timber roof trusses
 Timber framing

References

External links
 Bridge Basics
 Queen post
 King Post Truss vs Queen Post Truss via YouTube

Architectural elements
Structural engineering
Truss bridges by type